Susan Smith (born 7 December 1950) is a Canadian former swimmer. She competed in the women's 100 metre butterfly at the 1972 Summer Olympics.

References

External links
 

1950 births
Living people
Canadian female swimmers
Olympic swimmers of Canada
Swimmers at the 1972 Summer Olympics
Swimmers from Edmonton
Swimmers at the 1970 British Commonwealth Games
Commonwealth Games medallists in swimming
Commonwealth Games silver medallists for Canada
Commonwealth Games bronze medallists for Canada
Swimmers at the 1971 Pan American Games
Pan American Games bronze medalists for Canada
Pan American Games medalists in swimming
Medalists at the 1971 Pan American Games
20th-century Canadian women
21st-century Canadian women
Medallists at the 1970 British Commonwealth Games